This is a list of cancer clusters. A cancer cluster is a statistical event, which may or may not have a cause other than chance. There are other cancer clusters that occur without any obvious source of carcinogens.

Notes

References

External links
 List of known cancer clusters in the U.S.A.

Cancer clusters
 List of
Clusters